BBC Urdu was the Urdu language station of the BBC World Service, accompanied by its website, which served as a news portal and provided online access to radio broadcasts. The radio service was broadcast from Broadcasting House in London and Pakistan as well as from a BBC South & East Asia bureau in New Delhi. It also has a children’s channel CBeebies. The target audience were Pakistanis & Indian viewers. 

On December 30, 2022, after almost two decades of operation, BBC Pakistan stopped its Urdu Radio.

Programs
 Sairbeen

See also 

BBC World Service
 Abbas Nasir

References

External links
 BBC Urdu

British Indian mass media
British Pakistani mass media
Urdu-language mass media in the United Kingdom
Urdu
Radio stations established in 1941